Patons Rock is a coastal settlement in the Tasman District of New Zealand. It is located in Golden Bay, northwest of Tākaka.

The eponymous rock, Patons Rock, is located at the eastern end of the beach. Many of the dwellings in Patons Rock are holiday homes, and there are no shops in the settlement.

References

Populated places in the Tasman District
Populated places around Golden Bay / Mohua
Rock formations of New Zealand